Carmona Racing Circuit is a permanent motorbike racing and karting circuit outside Metro Manila in Carmona, Cavite, Philippines.

References

Motorsport venues in the Philippines
Buildings and structures in Cavite
Sports in Cavite